Troy Alex Scribner (born July 2, 1991) is an American former professional baseball pitcher. He played in Major League Baseball (MLB) for the Los Angeles Angels and Arizona Diamondbacks.

Career

Amateur
Scribner attended Sacred Heart University in Fairfield, Connecticut. In 2012, he briefly played collegiate summer baseball with the Falmouth Commodores of the Cape Cod Baseball League.

Houston Astros
He was signed by the Houston Astros as an undrafted free agent in 2013. He spent three seasons in the Astros organization, getting as high as Double-A with the Corpus Christi Hooks in 2014.

Los Angeles Angels
Prior to the 2016 season, he was traded to the Los Angeles Angels for cash considerations. Scribner started 2016 with the Arkansas Travelers, and was called up to the Salt Lake Bees on July 30. He started 2017 with the Bees, and was called up to the Angels on July 29, making his major league debut the same day. In his debut, Scribner pitched three innings in relief, allowing two runs on three hits and striking out two. Thanks to an Angels rally following his final inning of work, Scribner also was the winning pitcher for his debut game. For the season, Scribner appeared in 10 games, 4 starts for the Angels. He was 2–1 with a strikeout to walk ratio of 18/10.

Scribner was designated for assignment on April 3, 2018.

Arizona Diamondbacks
He was claimed off waivers by the Arizona Diamondbacks on April 6. He was called up on May 12th for a start against the Washington Nationals. He walked 6 batters in under 4 innings, ending with a no decision. After the game, he was sent down to AAA. He was released by the Diamondbacks on July 2, 2018. On July 13, 2018, Scribner re-signed with Arizona on a minor league deal.  He was released on May 7, 2019.

Sugar Land Skeeters
On May 17, 2019, Scribner signed with the Sugar Land Skeeters of the Atlantic League of Professional Baseball. He became a free agent following the season.

Personal life
His brother, Evan Scribner, last played in Major League Baseball for the Seattle Mariners.

References

External links

1991 births
Living people
People from Washington, Connecticut
Baseball players from Connecticut
Major League Baseball pitchers
Los Angeles Angels players
Arizona Diamondbacks players
Sacred Heart Pioneers baseball players
Falmouth Commodores players
Gulf Coast Astros players
Greeneville Astros players
Tri-City ValleyCats players
Corpus Christi Hooks players
Quad Cities River Bandits players
Lancaster JetHawks players
Arkansas Travelers players
Salt Lake Bees players
Reno Aces players
Sugar Land Skeeters players